Eduard Aleksandrovich Sukhanov (born 22 April 1991) is a Russian professional football player who plays for FC Leningradets Leningrad Oblast.

Club career
He made his Russian Football National League debut for FC Volga Nizhny Novgorod on 24 August 2014 in a game against FC Dynamo Saint Petersburg.

External links
 
 

1991 births
Sportspeople from Izhevsk
Living people
Russian footballers
Russia youth international footballers
Association football midfielders
Russian expatriate footballers
Expatriate footballers in Latvia
Expatriate footballers in Belarus
Expatriate footballers in Kazakhstan
Russian expatriate sportspeople in Latvia
Russian expatriate sportspeople in Belarus
Russian expatriate sportspeople in Kazakhstan
FC Vityaz Podolsk players
FC Rubin Kazan players
FK Ventspils players
FC Volga Nizhny Novgorod players
FC Baltika Kaliningrad players
FC Armavir players
FC Gomel players
FC Aktobe players
Latvian Higher League players
Belarusian Premier League players
FC Leningradets Leningrad Oblast players